Sagi is an area of Safi Tehsil, Mohmand Agency, Federally Administered Tribal Areas, Pakistan. The population is 41,384 according to the 2017 census.

References 

Populated places in Mohmand District